Gizella Sasvári-Csóka (born 13 November 1932) is a Hungarian middle-distance runner. She competed in the women's 800 metres at the 1960 Summer Olympics.

References

1932 births
Living people
Athletes (track and field) at the 1960 Summer Olympics
Hungarian female middle-distance runners
Olympic athletes of Hungary
Place of birth missing (living people)